Vince Nunatak is a nunatak of Antarctica.

Nunataks of Victoria Land
Scott Coast